Hans Aas (22 September 1880 – 5 August 1960) was a Norwegian trade unionist.

Aas was born in Tromsø. He joined his first trade union in 1906, and chaired the union  from 1914 to 1930. Having broken away from the Labour Party and joined the Communist Party in 1923, Aas later worked as a manager in the newspaper Arbeidet. He was a member of the secretariat of the Norwegian Confederation of Trade Unions from 1920 to 1923, then a deputy who met regularly in the place of Ole O. Lian, then a secretariat member again from 1927 to 1929. He formed a Communist minority in the secretariat together with Elias Volan, but they were replaced in 1929.

In politics, Aas was a member of Aker municipal council and chairman of Grorud district branch of the Labour Party. In the Communist Party, he was a member of the politburo for a period. Aas was also a driving force in Arbeidernes Esperantoforbund. He died in 1960.

References

1880 births
1960 deaths
People from Tromsø
Norwegian trade union leaders
Labour Party (Norway) politicians
Communist Party of Norway politicians
Politicians from Aker
Norwegian Esperantists